Jody Michelle Adams-Birch (born December 28, 1972) is the women's basketball program head coach at New Mexico State University.

Career
Adams-Birch was the former women's basketball program head coach at Wichita State University from 2008 to 2017. She was also assistant coach at Southern Illinois from 2018–2022.

Personal life
She married Roy Birch in June 2016.

Head coaching record

References 

1972 births
Living people
American women's basketball coaches
Auburn Tigers women's basketball coaches
Minnesota Golden Gophers women's basketball coaches
Murray State Racers women's basketball coaches
Southern Illinois Salukis women's basketball coaches
Tennessee Lady Volunteers basketball players
Kansas City Roos women's basketball coaches
Wake Forest Demon Deacons women's basketball coaches
Wichita State Shockers women's basketball coaches
Basketball coaches from Tennessee
Basketball players from Tennessee
New Mexico State Aggies women's basketball coaches